Nathan Elijah Johnson (June 19, 1920 – August 24, 2004) was an American football tackle.

Johnson was born in Dale, Illinois in 1920 and attended Benton High School in Benton, Illinois. He played college football at Illinois. He was selected as the most valuable player on the 1941 Illinois Fighting Illini football team.

He played professional football in the All-America Football Conference  for the New York Yankees in 1946 and 1947 and the Chicago Rockets/Hornets in 1947 and 1948. He was traded by the Yankees to the Rockets in May 1948 in exchange for fullback Bill Daley. When the AAFC disbanded, he played in the National Football League for the New York Yanks in 1950. He appeared in 65 professional football games, 49 of them as a starter.

He died in 2004 in Freeport, Illinois.

References

1920 births
2004 deaths
People from Hamilton County, Illinois
American football tackles
New York Yankees (AAFC) players
Chicago Rockets players
Chicago Hornets players
New York Yanks players
Illinois Fighting Illini football players
Players of American football from Illinois